There are 36 villages with municipal status in Wallis and Futuna, including the capital Mata'utu. The total population at the census of population of 2018 was 11,558.

List
The villages are listed by district, from the largest to the smallest:

Other villages (without municipal status)
Alofivai (Hahake District)
Fineveke (Mua District)

References

External links

 
Cities